Trent Gardner (1961–2016) was an American progressive rock musician and producer. He died on June 11, 2016.

Magellan (band) Discography

Music Video
 Icons - Music Video (2015)

Singles
 Icons (2015)
 25 Or 6 To 4  (2014)
 Cynic's Anthem (2013)
 The Better Suite (2013)
 Good to Go? (2012)
 Keep It (2012)
 Hello, Goodbye (2012)
 Dust in the Wind (feat. Rob Lopez) (2012)

LP
 Innocent God (2007)
 Symphony for a Misanthrope (2005)
 Impossible Figures (2003)
 Hundred Year Flood (2002)
 Test of Wills (1997)
 Impending Ascension (1993)
 Hour of Restoration (1991)

Trent's projects

Magellan (band)
Explorers Club: Age of Impact (1997) 
Explorer's Club: Raising the Mammoth (2002)
Encores, Legends & Paradox (A tribute to ELP - 1999)
Steve Walsh : Glossolalia (2000)
Leonardo: The Absolute Man (2001) : concept album about the life of Leonardo da Vinci
Jack Foster III : The Evolution of JazzRaptor (2003)
Jack Foster III : Raptorgnosis (2005)
Jack Foster III : Tame Until Hungry (2007)
Jack Foster III : Jazzraptor's Secret (2008)

Guest Members

John Petrucci (Dream Theater) - Guitar ("Age of Impact")
James LaBrie (Dream Theater) - Vocals ("Age of Impact")
Steve Howe (Yes) - Guitar ("Explorers Club (band)")
Joey Franco (Twisted Sister, Van Helsing's Curse)- Drums and Orchestral percussion ("Hundred Year Flood")
Jason Gianni - Drums (on "Impossible Figures")
Tony Levin (John Lennon, King Crimson, Peter Gabriel) - Bass ("Hundred Year Flood")
Ian Anderson (Jethro Tull (band)) - Flute ("Hundred Year Flood")
George Bellas - Guitar ("Hundred Year Flood")
Robert Berry (Alliance (band), 3 (1980s band)) - Guitar and Bass ("Hundred Year Flood")
Brad Kaiser - Drums ("Test Of Wills")
Hal Stringfellow Imbrie - Bass, Backing Vocals ("Hour of Restoration", "Impending Ascension")
Doane Perry (Jethro Tull (band))- Drums ("Impending Ascension")
Terry Bozzio (Frank Zappa) - Drums ("Age of Impact")

Appearances

Robert Lamm - Co-founder of Chicago (band) "Living Proof" (2012)
Songs: "Out Of The Blue" & "Living Proof" (Composition/Keyboards).
James LaBrie "Mullmuzzler: Keep It To Yourself":
Songs: "Beelzebubba" (Trent Gardner - Keyboards/Trombone/Programming, Wayne Gardner - Horn Transcription)
"As A Man Thinks" (Trent Gardner - Spoken Words).
James LaBrie "Mullmuzzler: 2":
Song: "Afterlife".
James Murphy "Feeding the Machine":
Song:"Through Your Eyes (Distant Mirrors)" (Trent Gardner - Vocals).
"December People - Sounds Like Christmas"
Song: "What Child Is This", "Happy X-mas/War Is Over".
"America Our Home"
Song: "What Child Is This", "Happy X-mas/War Is Over".
"The Moon Revisited" (Pink Floyd Tribute Album):
Song: "Money".
"Tales From Yesterday" (Yes Tribute Album)
Song: "Don't kill the whale".
"Supper's Ready" (Genesis Tribute Album)
Song: "Mama".
"To Cry You A Song" (Jethro Tull Tribute Album)
Songs: "A Tull Tale", "Aqualung".
"Working Man" (Rush Tribute Album)
Song: "Freewill".
"Tribute to the Titans"
Songs: "Money", "Eclipse".

References

Official Discography

External links
 Official Magellan Facebook
 Official Magellan Web Site
 Encyclopaedia Metallum page
Co-wrote songs with Chicago (band) frontman Robert Lamm on his album, Living Proof (2012)
Music Street Journal Album Reviews

Progressive rock musicians
Living people
Year of birth missing (living people)
Place of birth missing (living people)
Explorers Club (band) members